Echos (Greek:   "sound", pl. echoi  ; Old Church Slavonic:   "voice, sound") is the name in Byzantine music theory for a mode within the eight-mode system (oktoechos), each of them ruling several melody types, and it is used in the melodic and rhythmic composition of Byzantine chant ("thesis of the melos"), differentiated according to the chant genre and according to the performance style ("method of the thesis"). It is akin to a Western medieval tonus, an Andalusian tab', an Arab naġam (since 1400 "maqam"), or a Persian parde (since 18th-century dastgah).

Overview and semantics
The noun echos in Greek means "sound" in general. It acquired the specialized meaning of mode early on in the development of Byzantine music theory since the Octoechos reform in 692.

In general, the concept of echos denotes a certain octave species, its intervallic structure as well as a set of more or less explicitly formulated melodic rules and formulae that represent a certain category of melodies within the musical genre. As such, echos is the basis for composing or improvising new melodies that belong to it, as well as for properly performing existing pieces that have been written in it. These rules include the distinction of a hierarchy of degrees (tones, notes), where certain degrees figure as cadence notes (ἑστώτες) around which the melody will revolve prominently, or on which the melody will end most of the time. However, only very late stages of the theory (19th-20th century) actually provide systematic descriptions of echoi, while earlier stages use mostly diagrams, indirect descriptions and examples. Explicit detailed descriptions must still be provided based on extensive analysis, as is the case with modal phenomena in numerous other cultures.

History and reconstruction
Early treatises only state the initial or "base" degree (η βασή) which is the tone sung as a burden (ἴσον) by certain singers of the choir called isokrates in order to support any melody composed in a certain echos. By this support singers (psaltes) could easily recognise the relative position of each note as it was organised by tetrachords based on the basis note of each echos. This base degree of the mode was communicated by an intonation formula of a foresinger, known as enechema.

There are different styles by which to notate enechema which are crucial to the understanding of the different chant books and their notation. All these forms were written in red ink. The explicit long form was called by Jørgen Raasted intonation, but only the books of the cathedral rite used such explicit intonations, also between the sections, where these intonations were called medial intonation. This explicit form made sense, since the intonation also communicated the changes between the left and the right choir and their leaders performed these intonations to coordinate these changes. There was a short form as well which was called modal signature. It indicated the echos by the numeral like πλα' for "plagios protos," while the neumes sung with the last syllable of the enechema were written above right to the numeral. This short form was used in two different ways, as main signature it indicated the echos of a whole composition, but especially in sticheraria notators also wrote medial signatures between the neumes above a kolon of the text, in order to indicate that the melos changed here into another echos. The traditional Greek term for these medial signatures was "martyria", since the medial signature also "testified" the phthongos of the cadence made at the kolon.

Echemata of the dialogue treatise 
Within the dialogue treatise (erotapokriseis) a catalogue of short formulas memorizes each echos of the Hagiopolitan octoechos and its two phthorai (νενανῶ and νανὰ). These formulas are also called "echemata" (ἠχήματα)—or more often "enechemata" (ἐνηχήματα) or "apechemata" (ἀπηχήματα). The use echemata was also imitated by Carolingian cantors who used similar intonation formulas and collected them in a separate book called tonary.

Περὶ πλαγίων
Ἀπο τοῦ πλαγίου πρώτου ἤχου πάλιν καταβαίνεις τέσσαρας φωνάς, καὶ εὑρίσκεται πάλιν πλάγιος πρώτου· ὅυτως δὲ /
ἄνανε ἄνες ἀνὲ ἄνες·

Ὁμοίως καὶ ὁ β' ἤχος καταβαίνων φωνάς δ', εὑρίσκεις τὸν πλάγιον αὐτοῦ, ἤγουν τὸν πλάγιον τοῦ δευτέρου.
πλ Β οὕτως δέ.

Ὁμοίως πάλιν ὁ τρίτος καταβαίνεις φωνὰς τέσσαρας, καὶ εὑρίσκεται ὁ πλάγιος αὐτοῦ, ἤγουν ὁ βαρύς, οὕτως·

Ὁμοίως καὶ ἀπὸ τὸν τέταρτον καταβαίνων φωνὰς τέσσαρας, εὑρίσκεις τὸν πλάγιον αὐτοῦ, ὡς ἐστὶ ὁ πλ δ'οὕτως·

The enechemata of the medieval eight diatonic echoi already present a fundamental difference to the Carolingian octoechos: 
the kyrios and plagios do use the same octave species, but their basis tone with the ison is on the top of the pentachord within the mele of kyrioi echoi, while it is on the bottom within the mele of plagioi echoi;
the octave species (D—a—d, E—b—e, B flat—F—b flat, and C—G—c) are different as well from the Western octoechos as from the New Method, which had adapted the fret scheme of the tambur fingerboard as the common tonal reference for all Ottoman musicians. Traditional protopsaltes at Athos and Istanbul who belong to local schools of the eighteenth century, do indeed not follow the Chrysanthine intonation, they always intone a pentachord on a pure fifth between the bases of echos varys and kyrios tritos.
there is no absolute nor fixed position of the octave species. Sticheraric and papadic chant genres exploit not only the possibility to change between the echoi, but also the characteristic that every note (phthongos "sound, voice") has an echos defined by the octoechos. A register change is usually arranged by a transposition about a fifth, which turns a kyrios into a plagios and vice versa. Also other temporary transpositions are possible (see the five rings of the bigger Koukouzelian wheel), but not frequent.
the ruling tone system is tetraphonic and based on fifth equivalence which allows the fore mentioned register changes. Heptaphonia (similar to the Western use of systema teleion and solfège with seven syllables) exist only on the level of a melos within a certain echos. Changes to the triphonic system are indicated by the phthora nana. 
except of a pure diatonic octoechos the chromatic and enharmonic genus is not excluded, since even the Hagiopolitan octoechos accepted the use of two phthorai (νενανὼ and νανὰ).

Echemata of the Papadikai and their modern interpretation 
More information on the structure of echoi is only indicated in a very rudimentary way through diagrams  involving neumes—the Byzantine round notation. The details of the actual intervallic and melodic structure of echoi are virtually impossible to deduce from theoretical treatises prior to the 18th century. In fact, only relatively late systematic comparisons of the echoi with the makamlar of Ottoman court music, such as those by the Kyrillos Marmarinos, Archbishop of Tinos, in his manuscript dated 1747, and the reform of the Byzantine notation by Chrysanthos of Madytos at the first half of the 19th century make it possible to understand the structure of echoi and to attempt reconstructions of melodies from earlier manuscripts.

He already introduced his readers into the diatonic genus and its phthongoi in the 5th chapter of the first book, called "About the parallage of the diatonic genus" (Περὶ Παραλλαγῆς τοῦ Διατονικοῦ Γένους). In the 8th chapter he demonstrates, how the intervals can be found on the fingerboard of the tambur.

Hence, the phthongoi of the diatonic genus had been defined according to the proportions, as they were later called the "soft chroa of the diatonic genus" (τὸ γένος μαλακὸν διατονικὸν). For Chrysanthos this was the only diatonic genus, as far as it had been used since the early church musicians, who memorised the phthongoi by the intonation formulas (enechemata) of the Papadic Octoechos. In fact, he did not use the historical intonations, he rather translated them in the Koukouzelian wheel in the 9th chapter (Περὶ τοῦ Τροχοῦ) according to a current practice of parallage, which was common to 18th-century versions of Papadike:

Τὸ δὲ Πεντάχορδον, τὸ ὁποῖον λέγεται καὶ Τροχὸς, περιέχει διαστήματα τέσσαρα, τὰ ὁποῖα καθ᾽ ἡμᾶς μὲν εἶναι τόνοι. Περιορίζονται δὲ τὰ τέσσαρα διαστήματα ταῦτα ἀπὸ φθόγγους πέντε.

πα βου γα δι Πα

The pentachord which was also called wheel (τροχὸς), contains four intervals which we regard as certain tones [ἐλάσσων τόνος, ἐλάχιστος τόνος, and 2 μείζονες τόνοι]. The four intervals spanned five phthongoi:
πα βου γα δι Πα ["Πα" means here the fifth-equivalent for the protos: α']These five stations of the pentachord could be memorised by the echemata of the kyrioi echoi in ascending direction or by those of the plagioi echoi in descending direction (see Chrysanthos' explanation of the trochos parallage). Each of these echemata had the potential to develop an own melos within its melody types:

Each echema is followed by the incipit of a sticheron idiomelon which illustrates a certain melos of the echos. The following book Kekragarion illustrates, how the hesperinos psalm κύριε ἐκέκραξα has to be sung according to the sticheraric melos of each echos. The Kekragarion was later included in the printed editions of the Anastasimatarion or Voskresnik.

Chrysanthos' exegesis of the papadic enechemata 

In the chapter "On the apechemata" of his "Great Theoretikon", Chrysanthos translated the Byzantine octoechos and its intonation formulas (apechemata, or enechemata), as they could be found in the Papadikai, by offering an exegesis of the papadic apechemata in comparison to the simpler forms used by Orthodox chanters today. They served as kind of model for the composition within a certain melos, similar to the seyirler of an Ottoman makam.

Protos echos 

For the diatonic echos protos, the medieval enechema had the finalis on the top of the protos pentachord, while the enechema passes through it:

Chrysanthos made this exegesis to explain the melos of the whole echos:

In the first descending half he made the usual cadence on D (phthongos ) which corresponds to the finalis of the modern melos, while it was once the finalis and the basis of the plagios protos. The second half, when the melos raises again, but within the papadic melos (used with a cherubikon or koinonikon) it prepared a change to another base tone on the upper tetrachord like a (phthongos ).

Hence, according to the current practice of Orthodox chant the protos mele were rather based on the lower tetrachord, but the formula could be used a fifth higher likewise.

Unlike the tradition which always used register changes, the modern interpretation did not fix the base degree of echos plagios protos to the bottom of the pentachord, it could appear regularly at the top like in the troparic and heirmologic melos: a —c—b—a or D—F—E—D.

Chrysanthos' exegesis just passed the protos pentachord D—a in an ascending movement, before using the cadence pattern to the base degree of the mode.

Deuteros echos 

Chrysanthos' bridges between the diatonic  of the Byzantine past and the chromatic melos of the present Orthodox traditions.

As a result, the octave C—c between νη and νη' becomes slightly diminished. Chrysanthos' concept of diphonia was so radical that it found no commonplace in current chant manuals, instead a lot alternative interpretations proposed various divisions of the chromatic tetrachords between νη—γα (C—F) and δι—νη' (G—c).

Tritos echos 

Chrysanthos did not offer any exegesis for the apechema of the diatonic echos tritos. He only mentions the intonation of phthora nana instead, which is still used as the echos tritos intonation formula in current Orthodox traditions.

Hence, his exegesis of this enharmonic phthora is within the enharmonic genus and the triphonic tone system of the phthora nana.

Hence, the enharmonic  are not separated by a pentachord, but usually both set on F (phthongos γ' as well as υαρ), in troparic, sticheraric and heirmologic mele:

According to Chrysanthos it diminished the tritos pentachord to a kind of tritone, at least when it was set on fret arak of the Ottoman tambur, but there are also more traditional ways of intonation depending on the local school of a chanter.

The  have changed between the Byzantine and the Orthodox octoechos today.

Chrysanthos made for the papadic melos this exegesis.

A commonly used form of  might be the one which Chrysanthos mentions as the one used by Petros Peloponnesios.

The diatonic plagios of  according to the enechema known from the treatises called Papadikai

which was interpreted by Chrysanthos, as follows.

Chrysanthos interpreted also  as a diatonic .

He also mentioned a common enechema as it was used by Iakovos the Protopsaltes.

In this last paragraph of the chapter about the apechemata Chrysanthos referred to ten echoi within the tradition of Hagiopolites.

.

The echoi of the psalmody are eight.

Echos vs. maqam in eponymous compositional practice
In other Ottoman music traditions like the list of composed Mevlevi dance suites as models of well-known and new makamlar created by eponymous masters resulted in a proliferation of modes (makamlar, maqamat), echoi are not attributed to specific composers, but are rather regarded as belonging to the collective and anonymous heritage of liturgical chant. Eponymous compositions do exist throughout most of the history of Byzantine chant, but their echos is always classified from within the system of existing . Due to an interest for makamlar compositions Phanariotes like Georgios the Protopsaltes, one of the great teachers of Orthodox chant, also became a student of the dervish composer Dede Efendi, after he had learnt Turkish. Byzantine notation developed as a universal notation system during the 19th century which includes even attempts to integrate makamlar within the mele of the Octoechos, while ornamental details became part of an oral tradition.

Cultural "relations"
The system of echoi is rich and diverse. Closer study and comparison with modal systems of neighboring cultures reveals a complex network of cultural and ethnic influences throughout the centuries—a vivid exchange between musicians across the borders of ethnic and religious identity (Phanariotes). The basic theory of echoi is formalized in a system of eight modes called the Octoechos. See the article Neobyzantine Octoechos for a discussion of its origins and a critique of this concept vis-a-vis actual practice.

See also
Mode
Centonization
Ottoman makam, Arab maqām, and Central Asian Shashmaqam
Persian dastgah

Sources

Papadikai
.
.
.

Treatises of the New Method (since 19th century)

Anthologies of Makam Music

Studies

External links

Byzantine music theory
Melody types
Ottoman music